HMS Manly was a 12-gun  of the Royal Navy, launched in 1812. She served in the War of 1812, her boats participating in the Battle of Lake Borgne. She was sold in 1833.

Active service

Commissioned initially under Commander Edward Collier, she left Deal on 27 December 1812 and sailed to the Scheldt.

On 23 March 1813, Manly sailed to the Americas. There in June she chased, but lost, the privateer Young Teazer.

In the summer of 1813 Manly captured Flor de Jago, of 164 tons, sailing from Lisbon to Boston. Then on 2 August she captured the brig Hope, sailing from Batavia to Providence. Manly was stranded at Halifax on 13 November 1813 but was salved after incessant labor over three weeks.

Seventy men left Halifax; they reached Kingston, Ontario on 22 March, having traveled some 900 miles in winter, almost entirely on foot.

After Collier left, Lieutenant Vincent Newton took command of Manly. In May he was promoted to Commander, but remained with her. The squadron, without Manly destroyed shipping on the Potomac on 17 August. They then sailed up the Potomac to bombard Fort Washington while Vice-Admiral Alexander Cochrane landed the army at Benedict, Maryland on the Patuxent River on 19 and 20 August.

On 20 August the 40-gun fourth rate Endymion-class frigate , the frigate  and Manly sailed up the Patuxent River to follow the boats as far as possible. Cochrane and his force of marines and seamen entered Washington on the night of 24 August. The British then burnt the White House, the Treasury and the War Office. They left at 9 o'clock in the evening of the next day and returned to Nottingham, Maryland on the Patuxent where Cochrane boarded Manly. The campaign cost the Navy one man killed and six wounded, including one man of the Corps of Colonial Marines killed, and three wounded.

Battle of Lake Borgne
Commander Henry Montresor took command after Manly was sent to the Gulf of Mexico. In early December 1814, a British fleet massed for the assault on New Orleans. Between 12 and 15 December 1814, Captain Nicholas Lockyer of HMS Sophie led a flotilla of 45 boats, barges, lunches, and gigs to attack the US gunboats. He drew his flotilla from the fleet that was massing against New Orleans, including the 74-gun third-rate , Armide, Seahorse, Manly, and Meteor. Lockyer deployed the rowboats in three divisions, of which he led one. Commander Montresor of the Manly commanded the second, and Captain Samuel Roberts of Meteor commanded the third. After rowing for 36 hours, the British faced off against the Americans at St. Joseph's Island. On the morning of the 14th, the British engaged the Americans in the short, violent Battle of Lake Borgne. The British captured the entire American force, five gunboats and the tender, USS Alligator. The British lost 17 men killed and 77 wounded; Manly fortunately had no casualties.  then evacuated the wounded.

Lockyer was promoted to Post Captain on 29 March 1815, and Montresor and Roberts were promoted to post captain on 13 June. Montresor was also nominated as a Companion of the Order of the Bath on 4 June. In 1821 the survivors of the flotilla shared in the distribution of head-money arising from the capture of the American gun-boats and sundry bales of cotton. In 1847 the Admiralty issued a clasp (or bar) for the Naval General Service Medal marked "14 Dec. Boat Service 1814" to survivors of the battle that wanted to claim it.

After Montresor received his promotion to post-captain, Commander George Truscott took command of Manly in early 1815. He found that trade had reverted to normal. Manly later sailed from Wilmington, North Carolina to Bermuda and then back home. Commander Charles Simione replaced Truscott in June 1815.

Post-war career
In February 1824 Manly was fitted with iron and zinc on the bottom "for an experiment to preserve the copper".

Manly was in ordinary (reserve) in Portsmouth in 1826, and then fitted for sea between October 1826 and May 1827. She was recommissioned in February 1827 under Lieutenant William Field for the Halifax station.

She remained on the Halifax station into the early 1830s. In June 1828 Lieutenant H. W. Bishop assumed command. His replacement in October 1830 was Lieutenant John Wheatley.

Fate
Manly was sold out of the service in 1833 to Sturge for £550.

Notes

Citations

References
 
 
 

Brigs of the Royal Navy
1812 ships
War of 1812 ships of the United Kingdom
Ships built in Kent